The Liga Regional de Lima y Callao, the second division of Peruvian football (soccer) in 1941, and the third division of Peruvian football (soccer) in 1942 until 1950. The tournament was played on a home-and-away round-robin basis.

Structure 
Since its inception in 1941 as "Liga Regional de Lima y Callao", the Liga Regional consisted of the First Division, Second Division and Third Division.

Division levels 
Since its inception in 1941 as "Segunda División", the Liga Regional de Lima y Callao has changed levels (between 2 and 3). The table below shows them in details:

Champions

As Second Division Tournament

As Third Division Tournament

Titles by club

References

External links
 RSSSF

2
Peru
Defunct sports competitions in Peru